Ship Harbour is a rural community located along the Eastern Shore of Nova Scotia, Canada, in the Halifax Regional Municipality. It is situated at the head of a natural harbour of the same name which opens into the Atlantic Ocean. The area was settled in 1783 by a group of Loyalists from the Royal Nova Scotia Volunteer Regiment. The mi'kmaq referred to the area as Tedumunaboogwek, meaning "water-worn rock". The name of the community was derived from the name of the harbour, which in turn was derived from a rock at the entrance to the harbour, named Ship Rock, as it resembles a vessel from a distance. Ship Harbour is home to the Ship Harbour Mussel Farm (also known as Aquaprime Mussel Farm), one of the largest mussel farm in North America. It is also home to Ralph's Downeast Diner, a small diner on Highway 7. It was previously Family Fries. There is also a community hall that hosts meeting for the Lake Charlotte region. West Ship Harbour Road collides with Nova Scotia Trunk 7 in Ship Harbour, which connects Ship Harbour with Owls Head, Little Harbour, Clam Harbour,  Clam Harbour Beach Provincial Park and Lake Charlotte. Some minor roads include: Head Ship Harbour Loop Road, River Road, Bruce Drive, Newcombes Lane, Eisan Point Road and Goose Lane.

References

Citations

Bibliography

Communities in Halifax, Nova Scotia
General Service Areas in Nova Scotia